The Islamic Insurance Company, also known as the FISO-TAKAFUL, is a private insurance firm based in Mogadishu, Somalia.

Overview
The Islamic Insurance Company was founded in December 2014. It is the first full service insurance firm to be established in Somalia in over 20 years.

The company offers life, vehicle and property insurance to local businesses and individuals, in accordance with Islamic insurance tenets (takaful). It also aims to provide Sharia-compliant insurance products throughout the nation and globally.

Additionally, the firm is partnered with a number of international insurance companies.

See also
Dahabshil Bank International

References

External links
Major Insurance Companies of the Arab World 1986: Major Companies of Somalia

Financial services companies established in 2014
Insurance companies of Somalia
Companies based in Mogadishu
2014 establishments in Somalia